Bob Mould (sometimes referred to as Hubcap) is the third solo album by former Hüsker Dü and Sugar guitarist and singer Bob Mould. It was recorded and mixed between September & November 1995 and released in April 1996. Mould played all of the instruments on the album himself, and the sleeve notes declare, "This one is for me."  In the place of traditional band credits, the sleeve states, "Bob Mould is Bob Mould."

The song "Dog on Fire," which was chosen to be the theme song of The Daily Show, was originally written for this album.

Track listing
All songs written by Bob Mould

"Anymore Time Between"  – 5:40
"I Hate Alternative Rock"  – 2:55
"Fort Knox, King Solomon"  – 3:34
"Next Time That You Leave"  – 3:57
"Egøverride"  – 3:54
"Thumbtack"  – 4:59
"Hair Stew"  – 4:03
"Deep Karma Canyon"  – 3:01
"Art Crisis"  – 3:27
"Roll Over and Die"  – 5:11

B-Sides (Edsel re-release 2012)
"Wanted Was" – 4:01
"Eternally Fried" – 3:55
"Doubleface" – 5:21
"Fort Knox, King Solomon" (live) – 2:55
"I Hate Alternative Rock" (live) – 2:21

Track 11-13 are the B-Sides of the "Egøverride" single (Rykodisc RCD5-1050), which was released in October 1994.
Track 14 and 15 are the B-Sides of the "Fort Knox, King Solomon" promo single (Rykodisc VRCD 3342), which was released in June 1996. The two live tracks were recorded at First Avenue, Minneapolis, Minnesota on February 25, 1996.

Personnel
Bob Mould - vocals, guitar, bass, keyboards, loops, producer, artwork
Technical
Jim Wilson - engineer
Andy Katz - assistant engineer
Phil Magnotti - assistant engineer
Howie Weinberg - mastering
Barbara Longo - artwork

Charts

References

Bob Mould albums
1996 albums
Albums produced by Bob Mould
Rykodisc albums